Bortigiadas (Gallurese: Bultigghjata) is a comune (municipality) in the Province of Sassari in the Italian region Sardinia, located about  north of Cagliari and about  west of Olbia.

Bortigiadas borders the following municipalities: Aggius, Perfugas, Santa Maria Coghinas, Tempio Pausania, Viddalba.

References

External links
 Official website

Cities and towns in Sardinia